Mark A. Clouse (born July 5, 1968) is an American business executive in the food industry. Since January 22, 2019, he has been the president and CEO of Campbell Soup Company. Prior to that, he was the CEO of Pinnacle Foods from May 2016 through its acquisition by Conagra in late October 2018. He had previously spent two decades at Kraft Foods and its successor Mondelez International, where he held a variety of leadership positions.

Education and military career
Mark Alan Clouse attended Northwest High School in Cincinnati, Ohio, graduating in 1986. In 1990 he received a Bachelor of Science degree in Economics from the United States Military Academy at West Point. Following graduation, he served in the United States Army as a helicopter pilot for six and a half years, rising to the rank of captain.

Business career

Kraft Foods
In 1996 Clouse chose to retire from the Army to pursue a business career, and joined Kraft Foods, where he began by holding various positions of increasing responsibility around the world. He was President of Kraft Foods Greater China from 2006 to 2008. He was Managing Director of Kraft Foods Brazil from 2008 to 2010.

In 2010 he was appointed Senior Vice President of the Biscuits Global Category, a position he held until 2011, at which time he became President of Kraft's Snacks and Confectionery business in North America.

Mondelez International
In October 2012, Kraft Foods changed its name to Mondelez International as an international snack-food company, and spun off its North American grocery business as Kraft Foods Group. At that time Clouse became Executive Vice President and President of North America at Mondelez. In late July 2014 he was appointed to the newly created position of Chief Growth Officer, where his responsibilities included accountability for all key areas of the company's growth strategy, and oversight of teams responsible for corporate strategy, global categories, global marketing, global sales, and research, development, and quality. In January 2016 he was promoted to the newly created position of Chief Commercial Officer, with oversight of the execution of the company's commercial growth plan for all five geographic regions, and oversight of the global sales function.

Pinnacle Foods
Clouse was hired as CEO of the packaged-foods company Pinnacle Foods, effective May 2016, when then-CEO  Robert Gamgort left to become CEO of Keurig Green Mountain. He was also named to the company's board of directors at that time. Pinnacle's chairman cited his "strong operating background and proven track record of success, combined with his broad experience in both the North American market and more entrepreneurial developing market businesses".

During his tenure as CEO, Pinnacle Foods' stock climbed 54%, in contrast to most other packaged-food companies, which lost share value.

He successfully steered the company to being acquired by Conagra in 2018 for $10.9 billion. In late October 2018, Conagra completed its acquisition of Pinnacle Foods; Pinnacle ceased to be a publicly traded company and became a subsidiary of Conagra, making Clouse's position as CEO redundant.

Campbell Soup Company
In December 2018, Clouse was appointed President and CEO of Campbell Soup Company, effective January 22, 2019. The hiring was the result of a seven-month search after former CEO Denise Morrison resigned abruptly in May 2018.

The chairman of Campbell's board of directors stated, "Mark's leadership as CEO of Pinnacle Foods shows a clear track record of delivering solid revenue and earnings growth and generating significant value for shareholders. ... Mark was the Board's top choice due to his success leading organizations through significant transformations and his history of delivering strong results." Clouse was also the preferred choice of activist investor Third Point, which had recently settled with Campbell following an aggressive proxy fight. He was elected a member of the company's board of directors as well.

Personal life
Clouse met and married his wife Kathy in the 1990s while he was in the Army. They live in New Jersey and have two sons.

References

External links
Official bio at Campbell Soup Company

1968 births
Living people
Businesspeople from Cincinnati
Businesspeople from New Jersey
United States Military Academy alumni
United States Army aviators
American chief executives of food industry companies
Kraft Foods people
Mondelez International
Pinnacle Foods
Campbell Soup Company people
20th-century American businesspeople
21st-century American businesspeople